Nenad Erić (born 26 May 1982) is a Serbian-born Kazakh goalkeeper who last played and captained Astana in the Kazakhstan Premier League.

Career

Club
On 2 March 2021, Astana confirmed that Erić had left the club after 10 years, and that they had retired the #1 shirt.

International
Erić made his debut for Kazakhstan on 18 February 2015 in a 1-1 draw at home to Moldova.
 In February 2019, Erić revealed that he had retired from international duty at the end of Kazakhstan's involvement in the 2018–19 UEFA Nations League.

Personal life
On 13 June 2014, Erić became a Kazakhstani citizen.

Career statistics

Club

International

Honours
Astana
 Kazakhstan Premier League (5): 2014, 2015, 2016, 2017, 2018
 Kazakhstan Cup (2): 2012, 2016
 Kazakhstan Super Cup (3): 2011, 2015, 2018

References

1982 births
Living people
People from Požega, Serbia
Kazakhstani footballers
Kazakhstani people of Serbian descent
Kazakhstan international footballers
Serbian footballers
Association football goalkeepers
FK Sloga Požega players
FK Radnički 1923 players
FK Mačva Šabac players
OFK Beograd players
FK Borac Čačak players
Serbian SuperLiga players
FC Dynamo Barnaul players
FC Sibir Novosibirsk players
FC Kairat players
FC Astana players
Kazakhstan Premier League players
Expatriate footballers in Russia
Expatriate footballers in Kazakhstan
Serbian expatriate sportspeople in Kazakhstan